Oregon Route 103 is a  highway in the U.S. state of Oregon that runs between Jewell Junction and Jewell. It is also known as the Fishhawk Falls Highway No. 103 (see Oregon highways and routes), named after nearby Fishhawk Falls.

Route description
The southern terminus of Oregon Route 103 is at a junction with U.S. Route 26 at Jewell Junction near Mishawaka and Elsie. OR 103 continues north, passing through Pope Corner, Vinemaple, and Tideport, and ending at a junction with Oregon Route 202 in Jewell.

History
The Fishhawk Falls Highway No. 103 was established as a secondary highway on November 17, 1941. On September 19, 2002, Oregon Route 103 was assigned to the Fishhawk Falls Highway.

Major intersections

Gallery

References

External links

103
Transportation in Clatsop County, Oregon